The men's tournament of the 2012 European Curling Championships was held at the Löfbergs Lila Arena and the Karlstad Curling Club in Karlstad, Sweden from December 7 to 15. The winners of the Group C tournament in Erzurum, Turkey moved on to the Group B tournament. The top eight men's teams at the 2012 European Curling Championships, Sweden, the Czech Republic, Norway, Denmark, Russia, Switzerland, Scotland, and Finland, represented their respective nations at the 2013 World Men's Curling Championship in Victoria, British Columbia.

In the Group A competitions, Sweden remained relatively dominant, finishing with only one loss and qualifying for the playoffs, and the Czech Republic, Norway, and Denmark followed. In the page playoffs, Sweden blew past the Czech Republic, and Norway edged past Denmark. In the semifinal, Norway faced the Czech Republic in a rematch of last year's semifinal, and was able to move past them with a 6–4 victory. The bronze medal game saw the Czech Republic, skipped by Jiří Snítil, avenge a loss to Denmark's Rasmus Stjerne in last year's bronze medal game with a huge 12–4 win in eight ends. In the gold medal game, Sweden's Niklas Edin and Norway's Thomas Ulsrud faced off in a rematch of last year's final. Norway, attempting to win a third consecutive title, held an early lead in the fourth end, but the hometown favorite Sweden scored a deuce in the fifth end and stole two more in the sixth end to swing the momentum to their side. The two teams traded deuces in the next two ends, and Sweden clinched the win in the last end with a hit to score one point, wrapping up the game with a score of 8–5.

The Group C competitions in Turkey saw Turkey and Croatia advancing to the Group B tournament, joining fourteen teams in a two-group round-robin tournament. Latvia and the Netherlands finished at the top of the Blue Group, while Finland finished at the top of the Red Group. England won the last playoffs spot by defeating Italy in a tiebreaker. Latvia and the Netherlands each won their playoffs games against Finland and England, respectively, and Latvia advanced to the final, while Finland played the Netherlands in the semifinal. Finland won the semifinal, sending the Netherlands to play England for the bronze medal, where the Netherlands won the bronze medal with a score of 10–5. Finland then won the final over Latvia with a score of 7–4 in nine ends. Both Finland and Latvia advance to the Group A competitions, replacing Germany and Hungary, and Wales and Ireland were relegated to the Group C competitions. Germany was relegated to the Group B competitions for the first time in the history of the European Curling Championships. Finland played and won the World Challenge Games against France, advancing them to the World Men's Curling Championship.

Group A

Teams
The teams are listed as follows:

Round-robin standings
Final Round Robin Standings

Round-robin results

Draw 1
Saturday, December 8, 9:00

Draw 2
Saturday, December 8, 19:00

Draw 3
Sunday, December 9, 8:00

Draw 4
Sunday, December 9, 16:00

Draw 5
Monday, December 10, 14:00

Draw 6
Tuesday, December 11, 8:00

Draw 7
Tuesday, December 11, 16:00

Draw 8
Wednesday, December 12, 9:00

Draw 9
Wednesday, December 12, 19:00

World Challenge Games

Challenge 1
Friday, December 14, 20:00

Challenge 2
Saturday, December 15, 9:30

Challenge 3
Saturday, December 15, 14:00

 moves on to the 2013 World Men's Championship.

Playoffs

1 vs. 2
Thursday, December 13, 20:00

3 vs. 4
Thursday, December 13, 20:00

Semifinal
Friday, December 14, 13:00

Bronze-medal game
Friday, December 14, 20:00

Gold-medal game
Saturday, December 15, 15:00

Player percentages
Round Robin only

Group B

Teams
The teams are listed as follows:

Red Group

Blue Group

Round-robin standings
Final Round Robin Standings

Round-robin results

Red Group

Draw 1
Saturday, December 8, 8:00

Draw 2
Saturday, December 8, 16:00

Draw 3
Sunday, December 9, 8:00

Draw 4
Sunday, December 9, 16:00

Draw 5
Monday, December 10, 8:00

Draw 6
Monday, December 10, 16:00

Draw 7
Tuesday, December 11, 8:00

Draw 8
Tuesday, December 11, 16:00

Draw 10
Wednesday, December 12, 16:00

Blue Group

Draw 1
Saturday, December 8, 8:00

Draw 2
Saturday, December 8, 16:00

Draw 3
Sunday, December 9, 8:00

Draw 4
Sunday, December 9, 16:00

Draw 5
Monday, December 10, 8:00

Draw 6
Monday, December 10, 16:00

Draw 7
Tuesday, December 11, 8:00

Draw 8
Tuesday, December 11, 16:00

Draw 9
Wednesday, December 12, 8:00

Tiebreaker
Wednesday, December 12, 20:00

Playoffs

R1 vs. B1
Thursday, December 13, 20:00

R2 vs. B2
Thursday, December 13, 20:00

Semifinal
Friday, December 14, 8:00

Bronze-medal game
Friday, December 14, 13:00

Gold-medal game
Friday, December 14, 13:00

Group C

Teams
The teams are listed as follows:

Round-robin standings
Final Round Robin Standings

Round-robin results

Draw 1
Friday, October 5, 17:30

Draw 2
Saturday, October 6, 9:00

Draw 3
Saturday, October 6, 13:00

Draw 4
Sunday, October 7, 9:00

Draw 5
Sunday, October 7, 14:00

Draw 6
Sunday, October 7, 19:00

Draw 7
Monday, October 8, 9:00

Draw 8
Monday, October 8, 14:00

Draw 9
Monday, October 8, 19:00

Tiebreaker
Wednesday, October 9, 12:00

 advances to playoffs.

Playoffs
In the playoffs, the first and second seeds, Croatia and Turkey, played a semifinal game to determine the first team to advance to the Group B competitions. The loser of this game, along with the winners of the semifinal game played by the third and fourth seeds, Belarus and Slovakia, advance to the second place game, which determines the second team to advance to the Group B competitions.

Semifinals
Tuesday, October 9, 18:00

 advances to the Group B competitions.
 moves to Second Place Game. 

 advances to Second Place Game.

Second Place Game
Wednesday, October 10, 10:00

 advances to Group B competitions.

References
General

Specific

External links

European Curling Championships
2012 in curling
International curling competitions hosted by Turkey
2012 in Turkish sport
Sport in Erzurum
2012 in Swedish sport
International curling competitions hosted by Sweden
Sports competitions in Karlstad